Despite the absence of Mario Lemieux, the 1994–95 Pittsburgh Penguins season  started the off strong, by winning their first seven games. They remained undefeated in their first 13 games, going 12–0–1. However, after such a red-hot start to the season, the Penguins had a lukewarm record in their final 35 games, going 17–16–2. Jaromir Jagr won the Art Ross Trophy for most points (70), captain Ron Francis led the league in assists (48) and plus/minus (+30), and goaltender Ken Wregget led the league in wins (25). In a 7–3 Penguins' win over the Florida Panthers on February 7, Joe Mullen recorded an assist and became the first American-born NHL player to reach 1,000 points. Nine days later, Luc Robitaille scored four goals in a 5–2 Penguins win over the Hartford Whalers.

Off-season

Regular season
The Penguins had the highest shooting percentage in the NHL during the regular season, scoring 181 goals on just 1,400 shots (12.9%).

Playoffs
Despite finding themselves in a three-games-to-one series deficit against the Washington Capitals in the first round of the playoffs, the Penguins won Game 5 at home in overtime, 6–5, via Luc Robitaille's goal at 4:30 of the first overtime period. Peter Bondra, Dale Hunter, Jaromir Jagr and Kevin Stevens each scored twice in the game. Pittsburgh went on to win Game 6 in Washington, 7–1, and then closed out the series at home with a 3–0 victory in Game 7. It was the second time in four years that the Penguins had come back to defeat the Capitals after being down three games to one. The Penguins faced the New Jersey Devils in the second round, and won the opening game, 3–2. With only 1:15 remaining in Game 2, Jaromir Jagr tied the game at 2–2. The game seemed certain to head to overtime until a breakaway-goal by Devils captain Scott Stevens with just 29 seconds remaining. Claude Lemieux added an empty-net goal and the Devils tied the series with a 4–2 win. In the final three games of the series, the Penguins managed to score only three goals and were ultimately eliminated at home in Game 5, 4–1.

Final standings

Schedule and results

|- style="background:#cfc;"
| 1 || 20 || Pittsburgh Penguins || 5–3 || Tampa Bay Lightning || 1–0–0 || 2
|- style="background:#cfc;"
| 2 || 23 || Pittsburgh Penguins || 6–5 || Florida Panthers || 2–0–0 || 4
|- style="background:#cfc;"
| 3 || 25 || Pittsburgh Penguins || 3–2 || New York Rangers || 3–0–0 || 6
|- style="background:#cfc;"
| 4 || 27 || Ottawa Senators || 4–5 || Pittsburgh Penguins || 4–0–0 || 8
|- style="background:#cfc;"
| 5 || 29 || Pittsburgh Penguins || 4–1 || Washington Capitals || 5–0–0 || 10
|-

|- style="background:#cfc;"
| 6 || 1 || New York Rangers || 3–4 || Pittsburgh Penguins || 6–0–0 || 12
|- style="background:#cfc;"
| 7 || 4 || Tampa Bay Lightning || 3–6 || Pittsburgh Penguins || 7–0–0 || 14
|- style="background:#ffc;"
| 8 || 5 || Pittsburgh Penguins || 3–3 OT || New Jersey Devils || 7–0–1 || 15
|- style="background:#cfc;"
| 9 || 7 || Florida Panthers || 3–7 || Pittsburgh Penguins || 8–0–1 || 17
|- style="background:#cfc;"
| 10 || 9 || Pittsburgh Penguins || 5–2 || New York Islanders || 9–0–1 || 19
|- style="background:#cfc;"
| 11 || 11 || Montreal Canadiens || 1–3 || Pittsburgh Penguins || 10–0–1 || 21
|- style="background:#cfc;"
| 12 || 14 || Boston Bruins || 3–5 || Pittsburgh Penguins || 11–0–1 || 23
|- style="background:#cfc;"
| 13 || 16 || Hartford Whalers || 2–5 || Pittsburgh Penguins || 12–0–1 || 25
|- style="background:#fcf;"
| 14 || 18 || Pittsburgh Penguins || 2–4 || Hartford Whalers || 12–1–1 || 25
|- style="background:#ffc;"
| 15 || 19 || Buffalo Sabres || 3–3 OT || Pittsburgh Penguins || 12–1–2 || 26
|- style="background:#cfc;"
| 16 || 21 || Quebec Nordiques || 4–5 || Pittsburgh Penguins || 13–1–2 || 28
|- style="background:#fcf;"
| 17 || 24 || Tampa Bay Lightning || 4–2 || Pittsburgh Penguins || 13–2–2 || 28
|- style="background:#fcf;"
| 18 || 25 || Pittsburgh Penguins || 1–3 || New York Islanders || 13–3–2 || 28
|- style="background:#cfc;"
| 19 || 27 || Pittsburgh Penguins || 7–5 || Quebec Nordiques || 14–3–2 || 30
|-

|- style="background:#fcf;"
| 20 || 2 || Pittsburgh Penguins || 3–6 || Buffalo Sabres || 14–4–2 || 30
|- style="background:#cfc;"
| 21 || 4 || Pittsburgh Penguins || 4–3 OT || Boston Bruins || 15–4–2 || 32
|- style="background:#fcf;"
| 22 || 5 || Pittsburgh Penguins || 2–6 || Philadelphia Flyers || 15–5–2 || 32
|- style="background:#fcf;"
| 23 || 7 || Quebec Nordiques || 5–4 || Pittsburgh Penguins || 15–6–2 || 32
|- style="background:#cfc;"
| 24 || 9 || New York Islanders || 2–4 || Pittsburgh Penguins || 16–6–2 || 34
|- style="background:#cfc;"
| 25 || 11 || Buffalo Sabres || 2–6 || Pittsburgh Penguins || 17–6–2 || 36
|- style="background:#cfc;"
| 26 || 13 || Montreal Canadiens || 2–4 || Pittsburgh Penguins || 18–6–2 || 38
|- style="background:#fcf;"
| 27 || 15 || Pittsburgh Penguins || 5–8 || Montreal Canadiens || 18–7–2 || 38
|- style="background:#fcf;"
| 28 || 16 || Pittsburgh Penguins || 2–3 || Quebec Nordiques || 18–8–2 || 38
|- style="background:#cfc;"
| 29 || 19 || Pittsburgh Penguins || 4–3 || Ottawa Senators || 19–8–2 || 40
|- style="background:#cfc;"
| 30 || 21 || Pittsburgh Penguins || 3–2 || Buffalo Sabres || 20–8–2 || 42
|- style="background:#cfc;"
| 31 || 24 || New Jersey Devils || 2–5 || Pittsburgh Penguins || 21–8–2 || 44
|- style="background:#fcf;"
| 32 || 26 || Pittsburgh Penguins || 0–2 || Florida Panthers || 21–9–2 || 44
|- style="background:#cfc;"
| 33 || 28 || New York Islanders || 3–6 || Pittsburgh Penguins || 22–9–2 || 46
|-

|- style="background:#cfc;"
| 34 || 1 || Philadelphia Flyers || 2–3 || Pittsburgh Penguins || 23–9–2 || 48
|- style="background:#fcf;"
| 35 || 5 || Hartford Whalers || 8–4 || Pittsburgh Penguins || 23–10–2 || 48
|- style="background:#fcf;"
| 36 || 8 || Pittsburgh Penguins || 1–2 || Montreal Canadiens || 23–11–2 || 48
|- style="background:#cfc;"
| 37 || 10 || Pittsburgh Penguins || 4–3 || Ottawa Senators || 24–11–2 || 50
|- style="background:#cfc;"
| 38 || 11 || Washington Capitals || 1–3 || Pittsburgh Penguins || 25–11–2 || 52
|- style="background:#cfc;"
| 39 || 15 || Ottawa Senators || 2–5 || Pittsburgh Penguins || 26–11–2 || 54
|- style="background:#fcf;"
| 40 || 16 || Pittsburgh Penguins || 3–4 OT || Philadelphia Flyers || 26–12–2 || 54
|- style="background:#cfc;"
| 41 || 18 || New York Rangers || 5–6 || Pittsburgh Penguins || 27–12–2 || 56
|- style="background:#fcf;"
| 42 || 22 || Washington Capitals || 2–1 || Pittsburgh Penguins || 27–13–2 || 56
|- style="background:#cfc;"
| 43 || 23 || Pittsburgh Penguins || 4–2 || Hartford Whalers || 28–13–2 || 58
|- style="background:#ffc;"
| 44 || 26 || Pittsburgh Penguins || 3–3 OT || New Jersey Devils || 28–13–3 || 59
|- style="background:#cfc;"
| 45 || 28 || Boston Bruins || 1–4 || Pittsburgh Penguins || 29–13–3 || 61
|- style="background:#fcf;"
| 46 || 30 || Pittsburgh Penguins || 2–5 || Boston Bruins || 29–14–3 || 61
|-

|- style="background:#fcf;"
| 47 || 2 || Pittsburgh Penguins || 2–7 || Washington Capitals || 29–15–3 || 61
|- style="background:#fcf;"
| 48 || 3 || Florida Panthers || 4–3 || Pittsburgh Penguins || 29–16–3 || 61
|-

|- style="text-align:center;"
| Legend:       = Win       = Loss       = Tie

Suspensions

Injuries

Player statistics
Skaters

Goaltenders

†Denotes player spent time with another team before joining the Penguins. Stats reflect time with the Penguins only.
‡Denotes player was traded mid-season. Stats reflect time with the Penguins only.

Transactions
The Penguins were involved in the following transactions during the 1994–95 season:

Trades

Free agents

Signings

Other

Draft picks

Pittsburgh Penguins' picks at the 1994 NHL Entry Draft.

Draft notes 
 The Hartford Whalers' third-round pick went to the Pittsburgh Penguins as a result of a March 10, 1992, trade that sent Frank Pietrangelo to the Whalers in exchange for a seventh-round pick and this pick.
 The Boston Bruins' third-round pick went to the Pittsburgh Penguins as a result of an October 8, 1993, trade that sent Paul Stanton to the Bruins in exchange for this pick.
 The Hartford Whalers' seventh-round pick went to the Pittsburgh Penguins as a result of a March 10, 1992, trade that sent Frank Pietrangelo to the Whalers in exchange for a third-round pick and this pick.

See also
1994–95 NHL season

References
 
Penguins on Hockey Database

Pittsburgh Penguins seasons
P
Pitts
Pitts
Pitts